Founded in 1890 in Fribourg, Switzerland, the Katholische Deutsche Studentenverbindung Teutonia Freiburg i. Uechtland (K.D.St.V. Teutonia) is a colour-wearing, non-fencing, academic Fraternity/corporation. It is a member of the Cartellverband der katholischen deutschen Studentenverbindungen, known as CV.

Symbols 
The official short form of Teutonia is :Tt
Teutonia’s official colors are blue-gold-red, while the Fuxen, or pledges, wear blue-gold.
The Zirkel consists of intertwined lines, spelling v, c, f, or vivat, crescat, floreat and is followed by an exclamation mark.

Motto 
The motto is "Concordia Crescimus" and roughly means "Together We Grow."

Teutonia
Teutonia
Teutonia
Teutonia